Edith Christensen Wilson (May 23, 1899 - March 27, 1980) was a prominent assistant district attorney of San Francisco, prosecuting cases in the Women's Court.

Edith Christensen was born in Oakland, California, on May 23, 1899, the daughter of Anton and Olivie Christensen. She graduated from the University of California, Berkeley.

Wilson was a prominent attorney at law, being associated with her husband, David Salisbury Wilson, under the firm name of Wilson & Wilson, Attorneys. She was admitted to the bar in 1926.
 She was assistant district attorney of San Francisco, prosecuting cases in the Women's Court. 

She was a member of the Kappa Beta Pi, Native Daughters of the Golden West, California Club, Women's City Club, Lambda Omega.

She lived at 369 Pine Street, San Francisco, and later 2627 Clay Street, Oakland, California. He and her husband had one son, Bruce Wilson (born September 28, 1939).

References

1899 births
1980 deaths
Lawyers from San Francisco
Lawyers from Oakland, California
20th-century American lawyers
University of California, Berkeley alumni
20th-century American women lawyers